Isiah Kazunori Kimura Lagutang (born 3 August 1997) is a Guamanian international footballer who plays for Bank of Guam Strykers FC in the Guam Men's Soccer League.

International
Lagutang was called up for the Guam for the 2018 FIFA World Cup qualification matches against the Turkmenistan national football team and the India national football team.

International goals
Score and Result list Guam's goal tally first

References

1997 births
Living people
Guamanian footballers
Guam international footballers
Association football midfielders
Guamanian people of Japanese descent
People from Tamuning, Guam